David Garcia or García may refer to:

Sports

Dave Garcia (1920–2018), American former baseball coach, scout and manager
David García Dapena (born 1977), Spanish retired cyclist
David García Marquina (born 1970), Spanish retired cyclist
David García (baseball) (born 2000), Venezuelan professional baseball catcher
David García (footballer, born 1980), Spanish retired footballer
David García (footballer, born 1981), Spanish retired footballer
David García (footballer, born 1982), Spanish footballer for UD Las Palmas
David García (footballer, born 1994), Spanish footballer for CA Osasuna
David García Mitogo (born 1990), Equatoguinean footballer
David García (motorcycle racer) (fl. 1995–2005), motorcycle GP racer, see list of Grand Prix motorcycle racing European champions
 (born 1983), Spanish archer
David García del Valle (born 1981), Spanish judoka
 (born 1989), American weightlifter

Other
David Garcia (politician), Democratic candidate for governor of Arizona
David Garcia (journalist) (1944–2007), American broadcast journalist for ABC News
David Garcia (musician) (born 1983), American Christian musician, producer and songwriter

See also